Jason Ball may refer to:

 Jason Ball (American football) (born 1979), former American football center
 Jason Ball (Australian footballer) (born 1972), Western Australian Australian rules football player
 Jason Ball (activist) (born 1988), political candidate and amateur Australian rules footballer

See also
Jason Beckford-Ball, British editor